Sevda Sevan (November 6, 1945 – May 16, 2009) was a prominent Armenian-Bulgarian writer, the Ambassador of Armenia in Bulgaria from 1994 to 2005. Sevda Sevan was the third wife of Bulgarian writer and editor Varban Stamatov

Journal “Novinar”, 17.04.2008, Sofia, Interview with author  Sevda Sevan, “I am ashamed that our Parliament doesn’t recognize the Armenian genocide” 

When asked by Aglika Georgieva, who was her teacher in the art of writing, Sevda replied:
“I had the best teacher – my husband, the writer and great editor Varban Stamatov.  Up to the first 30 pages he guided me gently but firmly – not scribbling all over my manuscript, but suggesting to me – that “prose has to be muscular,  it has to be alive, thriving, to be aromatic.  Strain yourself, try to remember the smells” (of early childhood), he used to say to me.  So probably those aromas had been just there in my subconscious, because effortlessly,  they started arriving."

Books
Rodosto, Rodosto

References

Ambassadors of Armenia to Bulgaria
20th-century Armenian writers
2009 deaths
1945 births
Bulgarian people of Armenian descent
People from Nova Zagora